Rogue River Valley Grange No. 469 was a historic Grange hall located at 2064 Upper River Road  in Grants Pass, Oregon. It was built in 1923 in the bungalow craftsman style.

On March 9, 1992, Rogue River Valley Grange No. 469 was added to the National Register of Historic Places.

The Grange hall was destroyed by fire on June 18, 2012. The local Grange organization remains an active part of the Oregon State Grange.

References

Clubhouses on the National Register of Historic Places in Oregon
Buildings and structures in Josephine County, Oregon
Buildings and structures completed in 1923
Grange organizations and buildings in Oregon
Grange buildings on the National Register of Historic Places
National Register of Historic Places in Josephine County, Oregon
1923 establishments in Oregon
Burned buildings and structures in the United States